"J'me tire" is a single by Congolese-French rapper and singer Maître Gims, a former member of the band Sexion d'Assaut. It was released on 15 March 2013 as the first single from his debut album Subliminal.

The single was successful, becoming Maître Gims' first number 1 on the French SNEP Singles Chart. It also topped the Belgian Wallonia chart, charted in Belgium's Flanders Chart, in the Netherlands, and in Switzerland.

The music video was directed by Adam Nael and filmed in various desert and snowy mountainous settings. The mountain scenes were shot at Haute-Savoie.

Charts

Weekly charts

Year-end charts

Certifications

References

2013 singles
2013 songs
Songs written by Renaud Rebillaud
Gims songs
Songs written by Gims